The Bohr family is a Danish family of scientists, scholars and amateur sportsmen.

Its most famous members are:
Niels Bohr, physicist and winner of the Nobel Prize in Physics in 1922
Aage Bohr, son of Niels, also a physicist and in 1975 also received the Nobel Prize
Christian Bohr, physiologist; father of Niels and Harald. Grand father of Aage
Harald Bohr, mathematician and brother of Niels.

Other members include:
; schoolmaster, grandfather of  Harald and Niels; father of Christian
Ellen Adler Bohr, wife of Christian and mother of Harald, Niels and Jenny. She was the daughter of David Baruch Adler.
Margrethe Nørlund Bohr, wife of Niels and mother of Aage, Erik, Ernest, and Hans.

Niels received tremendous amounts of support from his family. Ellen, Margrethe, and Harald are all known to have scribed some of Niels Bohr's papers for him as he dictated. Among these were his dissertation and possibly his Nobel Prize essay.

Of Niels's sons, the oldest (also named Christian) died in a boating accident in young adulthood and another died from childhood meningitis. The others went on to lead successful lives, including Aage Bohr, who became a very successful physicist and, like his father, was awarded the Nobel Prize in physics in 1975.
 
Two of Aage's sons, Vilhelm and Tomas Bohr, are also academic researchers. Vilhelm is currently Senior Investigator in the Laboratory of Molecular Gerontology at the National Institutes of Health, working primarily on DNA repair. Tomas is a Professor of Physics at the Technical University of Denmark, working in the area of fluid dynamics, whose work recently helped disprove a report that a macroscopic fluid dynamic system can exhibit quantum-like behavior. Vilhelm's son, Eliot Bohr, is an experimental physicist working in the field of atomic, molecular, and optical physics.

Sport 

Niels and Harald played as footballers, and the two brothers played a number of amateur matches for the Copenhagen-based Akademisk Boldklub, with Niels in goal and Harald in defence. Harald went to play for Denmark at the Olympics in 1908, winning the silver medal. There is, however, no truth in the oft-repeated claim that Niels emulated Harald by playing for the Danish national team. Ernest Bohr  was a 1948 Olympic field hockey player.

References

External links 
 Niels Bohr Family Correspondence, 18XX-1962.
 Niels Bohr Archive

 
Medical families
Scientific families